Deb Massullo is a Canadian curler from Powell River, British Columbia.

Awards
British Columbia Curling Hall of Fame: 1995, together with all of the Pat Sanders 1987 team.
British Columbia Sports Hall of Fame: 1996, together with all of the 1987 Pat Sanders Rink.
Greater Victoria Sports Hall of Fame: 1997

Teams and events

References

External links
 
 Deb Massullo – Curling Canada Stats Archive

Living people
Canadian women curlers
World curling champions
Canadian women's curling champions
People from Powell River, British Columbia
Curlers from Victoria, British Columbia
Year of birth missing (living people)